Qari Habibur Rahman Attari Amjadi  (1996 – 16 January 2016) was an Indian teacher and politician from West Bengal belonging to Indian National Congress. He was elected as a legislator of the West Bengal Legislative Assembly for five times.

Biography
Rahman was a primary school teacher. He involved with the politics of Indian National Congress during his student life. He was a member of the West Bengal Pradesh Congress Committee.

Rahman was elected as a member of the West Bengal Legislative Assembly from Jangipur in 1972, 1977, 1982 and 1987 for consecutive four times. He contested in 1991 but did not win. Later, he was also elected as a legislator of the West Bengal Legislative Assembly from Jangipur in 1996.

Rahman contested from  Jangipur in 2001 as an independent candidate but did not win. In that year he was suspended from Indian National Congress. Later, his suspension order was withdrawn in 2002. He also contested from  Jangipur in 2006 but did not win.

Rahman died on 16 January 2016 at S. S. K. M. Hospital in Kolkata at the age of 79.

References

2016 deaths
Indian National Congress politicians from West Bengal
People from Murshidabad district
West Bengal MLAs 1972–1977
West Bengal MLAs 1977–1982
West Bengal MLAs 1982–1987
West Bengal MLAs 1987–1991
West Bengal MLAs 1996–2001
Indian schoolteachers
1930 births
Year of birth uncertain